Dry Prong is a village in central Grant Parish, Louisiana, United States. It is part of the Alexandria, Louisiana Metropolitan Statistical Area. The population was 436 at the 2010 census.

History
Dry Prong was incorporated as a village in 1945.

According to tradition, the village received its name when a family moved to the region in the 1870s to build a sawmill. To power the mill, they built a water wheel, only to discover that the creek over which they had built it went dry every summer: the creek was a "dry prong". The mill was soon rebuilt over a nearby creek which flowed all year, but the name stuck. The creek is now outside the city limits, on Highway 123. Shane Davis is the current mayor of the village.

Geography
Dry Prong is located at the center of Grant Parish at  (31.578819, -92.529487). U.S. Route 167 passes through the village, leading north  to Winnfield and south  to Alexandria. The village is within Kisatchie National Forest.

Major highways
 U.S. Route 167
 Louisiana Highway 122
 Louisiana Highway 123

Demographics

As of the census of 2000, there were 421 people, 176 households, and 124 families residing in the village. The racial makeup of the village was 95.25% White, 0.95% African American, 0.24% Native American, 1.66% from other races, and 1.90% from two or more races. Hispanic or Latino of any race were 2.61% of the population.

There were 176 households, out of which 30.7% had children under the age of 18 living with them, 55.7% were married couples living together, 11.9% had a female householder with no husband present, and 29.5% were non-families. 28.4% of all households were made up of individuals, and 14.8% had someone living alone who was 65 years of age or older. The average household size was 2.39 and the average family size was 2.91.

In the village, the population was spread out, with 25.7% under the age of 18, 5.7% from 18 to 24, 25.7% from 25 to 44, 27.8% from 45 to 64, and 15.2% who were 65 years of age or older. The median age was 40 years. For every 100 females, there were 97.7 males. For every 100 females age 18 and over, there were 94.4 males.

The median income for a household in the village was $32,917, and the median income for a family was $43,214. Males had a median income of $36,944 versus $18,864 for females. The per capita income for the village was $13,978. About 12.9% of families and 19.0% of the population were below the poverty line, including 25.0% of those under age 18 and 13.5% of those age 65 or over.

Education
Dry Prong residents are zoned to Grant Parish School Board schools.

Notable people
W. K. Brown, state representative from 1960 to 1972, was reared in Dry Prong.
Billy Chandler, state representative from Grant, La Salle, and Winn parishes, 2006 to 2012
Leonard R. "Pop" Hataway, sheriff of Grant Parish, 1976 to 2008; a member of the Louisiana Board of Pardons and Paroles; inductee of the Louisiana Political Museum and Hall of Fame

References

Villages in Grant Parish, Louisiana
Villages in Louisiana
Alexandria metropolitan area, Louisiana
Populated places established in 1945